Penn Medicine Princeton Medical Center (PMC), formerly known as the University Medical Center of Princeton at Plainsboro, is a 355-bed non-profit, tertiary, and academic medical center located in Plainsboro Township, New Jersey, servicing the western New Jersey area and the Central Jersey area. The hospital is owned by the Penn Medicine Health System and the only hospital of such in New Jersey. PMC is a major university hospital of the Robert Wood Johnson Medical School of Rutgers University and has a helipad to handle transport critical patients from and to other hospitals via PennStar.

About 
The hospital was previously located in Princeton on Witherspoon Street, until May 22, 2012, when the new location opened off of U.S.1. The new hospital was designed by a joint venture between HOK and RMJM Hiller.

The hospital was a member of the Princeton HealthCare System, which was formally incorporated into the University of Pennsylvania Health System in January 2018. The addition of the Princeton HealthCare System will make it the sixth hospital in the University of Pennsylvania Health System, which will employ over 3,000 staff and more than 1,000 physicians.

Pediatric care to the hospital is provided by doctors from the Children's Hospital of Philadelphia on PMC's inpatient pediatric wards, pediatric emergency department, and pediatric specialty care center.

Adjacent to the medical center is the Children's Hospital of Philadelphia Specialty Center that treats infants, children, adolescents, and young adults up to the age of 21.

It has no relationship with the fictional Princeton-Plainsboro Teaching Hospital, which was the setting for the medical drama House M.D. from 2004 to 2012, even though they share a similar location and name.

The hospital is notable for being Albert Einstein's place of death.

The hospital implemented strict protocols to limit spread of illness during the COVID-19 pandemic in 2020, including limiting visitors to patients throughout its facilities.

In 2018–19, the hospital ranked as #10 best in New Jersey, and high performing in 1 specialty and 3 procedures.

In 2020–21, U.S. News & World Report ranked the hospital as #9 in New Jersey, #24 in the New York area, and High Performing in the area of Orthopedics.

Affiliations
In addition to its affiliation with Penn Medicine, the hospital is affiliated with the Robert Wood Johnson Medical School and the Children's Hospital of Philadelphia.

See also 

 Robert Wood Johnson Medical School
 Princeton University
 University of Pennsylvania

References

External links

Hospitals in New Jersey
Plainsboro Township, New Jersey
Teaching hospitals in New Jersey
University of Medicine and Dentistry of New Jersey

Hospital buildings completed in 2012